Rodney Smith (born 6 April 1944, Batley, Yorkshire, England) was an English first-class cricketer, who played for Yorkshire County Cricket Club in 1969 and 1970.

Smith was a right-handed batsman, who played five first-class matches and three one day games.  He scored 99 first-class runs, with a best of 37 not out against Gloucestershire.  His slow, left arm orthodox spin bowling, was not called upon.

References

External links
Cricket Archive
Cricinfo

1944 births
Living people
Yorkshire cricketers
English cricketers
Cricketers from Batley